Rosrovut (Russian and Tajik: Росровут) is a village and jamoat in north-west Tajikistan. It is located in Devashtich District in Sughd Region. The jamoat has a total population of 14,419 (2015). It consists of 4 villages, including Dakhkat (the seat) and Rosrovut. In June 2005 the village suffered heavy damage from rainfall.

Notes

References

Populated places in Sughd Region
Jamoats of Tajikistan